The 1985 NCAA Division I Women's Tennis Championships were the fourth annual championships to determine the national champions of NCAA Division I women's singles, doubles, and team collegiate tennis in the United States.

The women's team championship was won by USC, their second title in three years. The Trojans defeated Miami (FL) in the final round, 6–3.

The women's singles title was won by Linda Gates from Stanford. Gates, along with partner Leigh-Anne Eldredge (both from Stanford), also won the women's double title, her second consecutive championship in the event.

Gates became the first woman to win consecutive NCAA Division I double's titles as well as the first woman to win the single's and double's championship in the same year. This feat would not be accomplished again until Keri Phebus, from UCLA, won both titles in 1995.

Host site
This year's tournaments were hosted by Oklahoma State University at the Oklahoma City Tennis Center in Oklahoma City, Oklahoma. The men's and women's tournaments would not be held at the same site until 2006.

Team tournament

See also
NCAA Division II Tennis Championships (Men, Women)
NCAA Division III Tennis Championships (Men, Women)

References

External links
List of NCAA Women's Tennis Champions

NCAA Division I tennis championships
College women's tennis in the United States
NCAA Division I Women's Tennis Championships
NCAA Division I Women's Tennis Championships
NCAA Division I Women's Tennis Championships